Apollodotus II was an Indo-Greek king who ruled in the western and eastern parts of Punjab. Bopearachchi dates him to c. 80–65 BC, and R. C. Senior to c. 85–65 BC. Apollodotos II was an important ruler who seems to have re-established the Indo-Greek kingdom to some extent of its former glory.  Taxila in western Punjab was reconquered from nomad Scythian rule.

Rule
Apollodotus II seems to have been a member of the dynasty of Menander I, since he used their typical deity Athena Alkidemos on most of his silver, and also Menander's title Soter (Greek: , "the Saviour"), on all his coins. On some coins, he also calls himself Philopator (Greek: , "the father-loving"), which proves that his father had been king before him. R C Senior guesses that Amyntas or Epander could have been his father.

Apollodotus' reign possibly began in the Punjab, when the Scythian king Maues ruled in Gandhara and its capital Taxila. What probably happened is that Apollodotus II took over Taxila after the death of Maues, though it is uncertain whether he defeated Maues or his descendants, or was allied or related to the dynasty of Maues. The late Indo-Greeks may have been rather mixed with both Indians and Scythians. R C Senior suggests that Apollodotus had struck an alliance with another Scythian king, Azes I.

The Scythian hold on Gandhara loosened after the death of Maues, and petty kings of mixed or uncertain origin, like Artemidorus the son of Maues, Telephus and perhaps Menander II emerged in the area. These kings posed no threat to Apollodotus II, who on some of his coins assumed the title Basileus Megas (Greek: , "Great King"), in echo of Maues' boastful title "Great King of Kings".

After the death of Apollodotus II, the Indo-Greek kingdom fragmented once more and more.

Coins of Apollodotus II

Apollodotus II issued a large number of coins. He struck silver with a diademed portrait on the obverse and a reverse of Athena Alkidemos, and also a unique coin with the reverse of a king, possibly Alexander the Great, sitting on a horned horse similar to Alexander's Bucephalus and holding his hand in a benediction gesture.

He struck bronzes with Apollo/tripod, a type introduced by his namesake Apollodotus I.

The coins of Apollodotus II are of different qualities. Some still have the realistic portraits characteristic of the earlier Indo-Greek coins, and Bopearachchi attributes these series to the western part of his kingdom. Others are badly struck and/or have clumsy and distorted portraits, and these Bopearachchi interprets as belonging to newly opened mints in eastern Punjab, presumably struck by Indian celators with little knowledge of Greek engraving skills.

On some of his coins there are both extra monograms in shape of Kharosthi letters. These monograms are interpreted, which was suggested already by W.W. Tarn, to have belonged to officials with Indian names. The coins therefore indicate that Apollodotus II relied more on his Indian subjects than earlier kings, and also opened new mints in eastern Punjab where Greek presence was scarce.

Overstrikes
Apollodotus II overstruck a bronze of Maues. Zoilos II overstruck some of the coins of Apollodotus II, as did Azes I.

References
 "The Shape of Ancient Thought. Comparative studies in Greek and Indian Philosophies" by Thomas McEvilley (Allworth Press and the School of Visual Arts, 2002) 
 "The Greeks in Bactria and India", W.W. Tarn, Cambridge University Press.

External links
Coins of Apollodotus II
More coins of Apollodotus II

Indo-Greek kings
1st-century BC rulers in Asia